Cloz is a comune (municipality) in Trentino in the northern Italian region Trentino-Alto Adige/Südtirol, located about  north of Trento.

Geography

Cloz borders the following municipalities: Laurein, Brez, Revò, Dambel and Romallo.

Demographic evolution

References

External links
 Homepage of the city

Cities and towns in Trentino-Alto Adige/Südtirol
Nonsberg Group